Alongkorn Thongjean (born March 12, 1992) is a Thai professional footballer who plays as a right-back.

References

External links
 at Soccerway

1992 births
Living people
Alongkorn Thongjean
Association football defenders
Alongkorn Thongjean
Alongkorn Thongjean
Alongkorn Thongjean